An Ekwe is an Igbo traditional musical instrument. The ekwe is a type of drum with rectangular cavity 'slits' in the hollowed out wooden interior. The ekwe is made out of wood and most commonly a tree trunk. The ekwe comes in a variety of sizes and designs and each size is determined by the purpose it is being used for. An ekwe can be used for traditional cultural events, or it can be used for music. The ekwe is also used as a type of talking drum communicating, in the past, with others at long distances. The ekwe's rhythm gives different rhythms from celebration to emergencies.

References

Igbo musical instruments
Idiophones struck directly
Slit drums